Graham Sandercock is an author, journalist and former teacher living in Cornwall,  UK, who once stood for the UK parliamentary seat of South East Cornwall. He was head of the Geography department at Devonport High School for Boys. He left the school in 2008 after teaching there for 29 years.

Politics
Sandercock stood as a Mebyon Kernow parliamentary candidate for South East Cornwall in the UK General Election of 2005 and gained 769 votes, 1.4% of the turnout, coming fifth overall.

Cornish language
Sandercock has released several albums of popular songs in Cornish. He has published several books in the Cornish language including a beginner's course in Cornish Holyewgh an Lergh, which was first published in 2005 and is accompanied by two cassettes. He has edited the monthly magazine An Gannas since its inception in 1977. He is an elected member of Kesva an Taves Kernewek "Cornish Language Board".

References

Related links

UK General Election 2005 results

Living people
Politicians from Cornwall
Cornish-speaking people
Cornish language
Cornish nationalists
Mebyon Kernow politicians
Year of birth missing (living people)
20th-century English educators